Matt Wolf (born May 11, 1982) is an American filmmaker, documentarian, and producer. His notable films include Wild Combination: A Portrait of Arthur Russell, Teenage, Bayard & Me, Recorder: The Marion Stokes Project, and Spaceship Earth. In 2010, he was awarded a Guggenheim fellowship. His subjects include youth culture, artists, archives, music, and queer history.

Life
Wolf was born in San Jose, California. He attended film school at New York University in New York City, where he continues to be based.

Work 
Wolf's films have played widely in festivals and have been distributed internationally in theaters and on television. His first feature documentary, Wild Combination: A Portrait of Arthur Russell, is about the avant-garde cellist and disco producer Arthur Russell. His second feature, Teenage, is about the birth of youth culture, based on a book by the British punk author Jon Savage.

In 2019 his documentary about Marion Stokes titled Recorder: The Marion Stokes Project, premiered at the 2019 Tribeca Film Festival. The film was released by Zeitgeist Films in association with Kino Lorber and is to air on PBS Independent Lens.

His two-hour documentary on Biosphere 2 titled Spaceship Earth premiered at the 2020 Sundance Film Festival and was released by Neon in May 2020.

Wolf also directs and produces for television, including 2015's HBO Documentary It’s Me, Hilary: The Man Who Drew Eloise, which premiered at Sundance and was executive produced by Lena Dunham and Jenni Konner.

Filmography

Feature films
 Wild Combination: A Portrait of Arthur Russell (2008)  
 Teenage (2014)
 Recorder: The Marion Stokes Project (2019)
 Spaceship Earth (2020)

Short films
 I Remember: A Film About Joe Brainard (documentary short, 2012)
 The Face of AIDS (documentary short, 2016)
 The Town I Live In (documentary short, 2017)
 Bayard & Me (documentary short, 2017)

References

External links
 
 
 
 

1982 births
American documentary filmmakers
Living people
People from San Jose, California
Film directors from California